Hector Salazar may refer to:

 Héctor Luis Palma Salazar (born 1940), former Mexican drug trafficker
 Hector Salazar (Law & Order), a detective from the short-lived Law & Order: Trial by Jury
 a character from Sons of Anarchy
 a character from the third season of 24

See also  
 Salazar (disambiguation)